Sampson is the given name of:

People:
 Sampson the Hospitable (died c. 530), venerated as a saint in the Eastern Churches
 Sampson Avard (1800–1869), leader of a band of Mormon vigilantes in Missouri
 Sampson Eardley, 1st Baron Eardley (1744–1824), Jewish-British banker in the City of London, son of Sampson Gideon (see below)
 Sampson Erdeswicke (died 1603), English antiquarian
 Sampson Eure (died 1659), English Member of Parliament
 Sampson Gamgee (1828–1886), British surgeon and indirect namesake of The Lord of the Rings character Sam Gamgee
 Sampson Gideon (1699–1762), Jewish-British banker in the City of London
 Sampson Handley (1872–1962), English surgeon
 Sampson Willis Harris (1809–1857), American politician and lawyer in the South
 Sampson Hele (1582–1655), English Member of Parliament
 Sampson Hopkins (died 1622), English merchant and Member of Parliament
 Sampson Hosking (1888–1974), Australian rules footballer and coach
 Sampson Kempthorne (1809–1873), English architect
 Sampson Lennard (died 1615), English Member of Parliament
 Sampson Lloyd, various members of a family in Birmingham, England; one co-founded a bank which eventually became Lloyds Bank
 Sampson Lort, Welsh Member of Parliament in 1659
 Sampson Low (1797–1886), London bookseller and publisher
 Sampson Mathews (c. 1737 – 1807), American soldier, legislator and college founder
 Sampson Moore (1812–1877), engineer based in Liverpool, England
 Sampson Mordan (1790–1843), British silversmith and co-inventor of the first patented mechanical pencil
 Sampson Nanton (born 1977), journalist and television news presenter in Trinidad and Tobago
 Sampson Sievers (1900–1979), Russian Orthodox Christian priest and mystic
 Sampson Simson (1780–1857), American philanthropist

Biblical figures:
 Samson or Sampson, the man of extraordinary strength in the Book of Judges in the Bible
Fictional Characters
 Sampson, a character in the play Romeo and Juliet, by William Shakespeare

See also
 Samson (name)